Fatima bint Mubarak Al Ketbi is the third wife of Sheikh Zayed bin Sultan Al Nahyan, the founder and inaugural president of United Arab Emirates. She is referred to as the mother of sheikhs and as the mother of the UAE also as The mother of Nation

Early life
Sheikha Fatima was born in Al-Hayer in Al-Ain as the only daughter to her parents. Her family is Bedouin and religious.

Achievements
Sheikha Fatima is a supporter of women's rights in the UAE. She is the supreme chairperson of the Family Development Foundation (FDF) and significantly contributed to the foundation of the first women's organization in 1976, the Abu Dhabi Society for the Awakening of Women. She was also instrumental in a nationwide campaign advocating for girls' education and heads the UAE's General Women Union (GWU), which she founded in 1975. She is also the President of the Motherhood and Childhood Supreme Council. At the end of the 1990s, she publicly announced that women should be members of the Federal National Council of the Emirates.

Sheikha Fatima also supports efforts concerning adult literacy and provision of free public education for girls. An award named the Sheikha Fatima Award for Excellence has been presented in her honor since 2005 for the outstanding academic performance and commitment to the environment and world citizenship of the female recipients. The reward includes a full-tuition scholarship that extends to schools across the Middle East and in 2010 expanded to India. She has consistently supported women in sport and initiated an award called the Sheikha Fatima bint Mubarak Award for Woman Athletes. Sheikha Fatima bint Mubarak also created a women's sports academy called Fatima Bint Mubarak Ladies Academy in Abu Dhabi. The Sheikha Fatima Institute of Nursing and Health Sciences in Lahore, Pakistan, is named after her.

On 30 March 2021, Sheikha Fatima launched a National Action Plan on women, peace and security - the first National Action Plan developed in a Gulf Cooperation Council (GCC) country. The plan aims to empower and support women globally by promoting the UN Security Council Resolution 1325.

Awards
In 1997, five different organizations of the United Nations had awarded Sheikha Fatima for her significant efforts for women's rights. The UNIFEM stated, "she is the champion of women's rights." She was also awarded the Grand Cordon of the Order of November 7th by the Tunisian president Zine El Abidine Ben Ali on 26 June 2009 for her contributions to raise the status of Arab women. She was also given the UNESCO Marie Curie Medal for her efforts in education, literacy and women's rights, being the third international and the first Arab recipient of the award.

On March 16, 2005, she received the Athir Class of the National Order of Merit of Algeria.

Marriage and children
Fatima bint Mubarak Al Ketbi married Sheikh Zayed Al Nahyan when he was the ruler of the Eastern region in 1960. Sheikh Zayed met her in a mosque. They moved to Abu Dhabi when Sheikh Zayed became the ruler in August 1966. She was his most influential and favorite spouse because of her influential personality. She is the mother of Sheikh Mohammed, the current President of the United Arab Emirates and the ruler of Abu Dhabi; Sheikh Hamdan, Sheikh Hazza, Sheikh Tahnoun, Sheikh Mansour, Sheikh Abdullah, Sheikha Shamma and Sheikha Alyazia. They are the most powerful block in the ruling family of Abu Dhabi, the Al Nahyans.

References

Living people
Spouses of presidents of the United Arab Emirates
House of Al Nahyan
People from Al Ain
Year of birth missing (living people)
Emirati activists
Women presidents of organizations
Women's rights activists
Recipients of orders, decorations, and medals of Sudan